Lattinella is a genus of mites in the family Parholaspididae. There is at least one described species in Lattinella, L. palliolatus.

References

Parholaspididae
Articles created by Qbugbot